Echium simplex, commonly known as tower of jewels, is a herbaceous biennial plant which grows up to 3m in height.

Habitat
It is a frost intolerant species requiring sustained periods of sunlight to thrive. It is endemic in the island of Tenerife mainly in Macizo de Anaga.

Description
The plant is biennial producing a dense rosette in the first year and producing the distinctive inflorescence to a height of  during the second year. The flowers are white and the plant is in bloom from February to April in Tenerife. E. simplex is widely available as a garden flower in warm temperate areas. It is very attractive to bees and produces a distinctively flavoured honey.

References

simplex
Flora of the Canary Islands